Kamrul Hasan Khan is a Bangladeshi renowned pathologist, academic and freedom fighter who served as the Vice Chancellor of Bangabandhu Sheikh Mujib Medical University (BSMMU).

Education and career
Khan passed his MBBS from Mymensingh Medical College in 1982. He then joined government service as a medical officer in 1984. He later joined IPGMR (later renamed BSMMU) in 1991.

Personal life
Freedom fighter Kamrul Hassan Khan was born on March 12, 1955, in Bhavandatta village of Ghatail Upazila of Tangail District. Khan's ancestors originated from Tangail. He is married to Masuda Begum, a professor of hematology. Khan's elder brother, Mamunur Rashid, is a playwright and theater activist.

Research and social work
Kamrul served as the general secretary of the association at Bangabandhu Sheikh Mujib Medical University from 1999 to 2015. Do a study titled 'Effects of Topical Application of Ethylene Glycol on Rats'. Khan is a two-time elected organizational secretary of the Bangladesh Medical Association (BMA), former joint secretary of the BCS Central Coordination Council (26 cadre), a member of the Working Council of the Progressive Association of Bangladesh Environmental Movement (BAPA) and engineers, agronomists and physicians, Central In-Service Joint Trainee Physician Council. He served as a life adviser to the caller and the finder.

References

Living people
People from Tangail District
Place of birth missing (living people)
Bangabandhu Sheikh Mujib Medical University faculty
Bangladeshi medical academics
1955 births
Bangladeshi physicians